Senex Energy Limited (Senex) is an Australian energy company that was listed on the Australian Securities Exchange (ASX) in 1984. The name is not an acronym, but refers to the Latin word Senex.

Operations
Senex owns producing oil assets in Australia's Cooper Basin and operates exploration permits covering more than 70,000 square kilometres in South Australia and Queensland.

Oil production
Senex operates more than 10 oil fields in the South Australian Cooper Basin, including Growler oil field, which was connected via pipeline to the Moomba oil processing facility in December 2012.

In February 2015, Senex Energy discovered an oil pay zone at its Martlet North-1 exploration well on the western flank of the South Australian Cooper Basin.

Gas exploration
Senex is one of a handful of exploration companies seeking to develop a commercial scale unconventional gas resource in the South Australian Cooper Basin. Senex has not partnered with a multinational energy company to share the cost of its gas exploration programs.

History
Senex was listed on the ASX in August 1984 as Victoria Petroleum N.L. At that time, the company was based in Perth and headed by Founding Managing Director John Kopcheff, who retired from the Board in September 2010.

In June 2010, the company announced the appointment of Ian Davies as Managing Director and advised that the business would relocate its head office to Brisbane. Later in the year, the business announced "aggressive development programs" for its oil and gas acreage in the Cooper and Surat Basins, further leadership appointments  and obtained shareholder approval to amend the company's status and constitution.

On 14 February 2011, the company officially changed its name to Senex Energy Limited and adopted the ASX ticker code "SXY". One week later, the company announced a merger with fellow Cooper Basin oil producer Stuart Petroleum.

Senex was admitted to the ASX/S&P 200 index in April 2012. In March 2013, the ASX amended the company's classification to a Mining Producing Entity, for reporting purposes.

On 13 December 2021, Senex agreed to be acquired by South Korean steel maker POSCO International for A$610 million.

References

External links 
 

Oil companies of Australia
Natural gas companies of Australia
Companies based in Brisbane
Energy companies established in 1984
Non-renewable resource companies established in 1984
Companies listed on the Australian Securities Exchange